The Under Secretary of Homeland Security for Intelligence and Analysis is a high-level civilian official in the United States Department of Homeland Security. The Under Secretary, as head of the Office of Intelligence and Analysis at DHS, is the principal staff assistant and adviser to the Secretary of Homeland Security and the Deputy Secretary of Homeland Security for fusing law enforcement and intelligence information relating to terrorism and other critical threats.

The Under Secretary for Intelligence and Analysis is appointed by the President of the United States with the consent of the United States Senate to serve at the pleasure of the President.

Overview
The Under Secretary of Homeland Security for Intelligence and Analysis is the Chief Intelligence Officer for the United States Department of Homeland Security. Representing DHS within the United States Intelligence Community, the Under Secretary participates in inter-agency counter-terrorism efforts and is responsible for ensuring that state and local law enforcement officials receive information on critical threats from national-level intelligence agencies.

When the position was created by the Homeland Security Act of 2002 along with DHS, the position was originally known as the Assistant Secretary of Homeland Security for Information Analysis. At that time, the position was within the DHS Information Analysis and Infrastructure Protection Directorate. Following a 2005 reorganization of DHS, the position was made independent, appointed DHS Chief Intelligence Officer, and renamed Assistant Secretary of Homeland Security for Intelligence and Analysis. The Implementing Recommendations of the 9/11 Commission Act of 2007 (Public Law 110-53) was enacted on August 7, 2007 and reorganized intelligence operations at DHS, elevating the Assistant Secretary to the Under Secretary level.

With the rank of Under Secretary, the Under Secretary for Intelligence and Analysis is a Level III position within the Executive Schedule. Since January 2022, the annual rate of pay for Level III is $187,300.

Reporting officials
As head of the DHS Office of Intelligence and Analysis, officials reporting to the Under Secretary include:
Principal Deputy Under Secretary of Intelligence and Analysis
Deputy Under Secretary for Intelligence Enterprise Operations
Deputy Under Secretary for Intelligence Enterprise Readiness

Officeholders

References